Christian Hafner (born 19 June 1972) is an Italian luger who competed during the 1990s. A natural track luger, he won the silver medal in the men's doubles event at the 1994 FIL World Luge Natural Track Championships in Gsies, Italy.

Hafner also won three medals in the men's doubles event at the FIL European Luge Natural Track Championships with two silver in 1993 and 1997 and a bronze in 1995.

References
FIL-Luge profile
Natural track European Championships results 1970-2006.
Natural track World Championships results: 1979-2007

External links
 

1972 births
Living people
Italian lugers
Italian male lugers
Sportspeople from Südtirol